Pier Lorenzo Spoleti (1680–1726) was an Italian painter of the Baroque period, active mainly in his natal city of Genoa. He was born and died in Finale Ligure.

Spoleti's parents died when he was young and he went to live with an aunt, who, seeing his interest in art, sent him to apprentice with Domenico Piola at the age of 15. He returned to his hometown after a few years, where he married; then he traveled to Cadiz, Spain to look for employment, leaving his wife behind in Finale Ligure. From Cadiz, he followed a patron who had been reassigned to Madrid. He soon traveled to Lisbon, where he worked for four years, then returned to Genoa.

In Genoa, his former master, Piola, was impressed with his skills. Spoleti was known for portrait painting, and made reproductions of master paintings by Titian and others whose works he had seen in Madrid. For the parish church of Finale he painted copies of major canvases for the chorus. His major pupils were Giuseppe Folco, Giuseppe Piuma and Giacomo Grana.

References

1680 births
1726 deaths
17th-century Italian painters
Italian male painters
18th-century Italian painters
Painters from Genoa
Italian Baroque painters
18th-century Italian male artists